This is a list of all tornadoes that were confirmed by local offices of the National Weather Service in the United States from January to March 2010.

United States yearly total

January

January 18 event

January 19 event

January 20 event

January 21 event

January 22 event

January 23 event

January 24 event

February

February 27 event

March

March 8 event

March 10 event

March 11 event

March 12 event

March 25 event

March 28 event

March 29 event

See also
Tornadoes of 2010

Notes

References

 01
2010, 01
Tornadoes
Tornadoes
Tornadoes